= Mariópolis, Rio de Janeiro =

Region in Rio de Janeiro

Coordinates: 22°49′36″S 43°24′52″W

Mariópolis is a region of Rio de Janeiro, but it is not officially recognized as a neighborhood by the Government of Brazil.
